The Josef B. Teutsch House is a historic monument located in Sighișoara, Mureș County, Romania.

Historic monuments in Mureș County
Sighișoara